Roberto Cavallo (born 28 April 1967) is a Venezuelan footballer. He played in twelve matches for the Venezuela national football team from 1989 to 1991. He was also part of Venezuela's squad for the 1989 Copa América tournament.

References

External links
 

1967 births
Living people
Venezuelan footballers
Venezuela international footballers
Association football defenders
Footballers from Caracas